The Korean Wedding Chest is a 2009 documentary film about Korean wedding traditions directed by Ulrike Ottinger. The German language film was described as "capturing the collision of ancient tradition and modern culture on the subject of love and marriage in Korea in a film that echoes the beauty, precision and care of the rituals she examines" by the Los Angeles Times.

The Washington Post's website refers to the surrealist style of the film as being well suited to "the regal pacing of the ritual" and calls the film one of Ottinger's most praised works.

See also
Pyebaek
Marriage in South Korea

References

External links
Ulrike Ottinger's website
British Wedding Traditions
Seychelles Wedding - Tropical Marriage

The Korean Wedding Chest at Women Make Movies

Films directed by Ulrike Ottinger
German documentary films
Korean culture
Weddings by culture
2000s German-language films
2000s Korean-language films
South Korean documentary films
2009 films
2009 documentary films
Documentary films about South Korea
2009 multilingual films
German multilingual films
South Korean multilingual films
2000s German films
2000s South Korean films